1451 Granö, provisional designation , is a stony Florian asteroid and slow rotator from the inner regions of the asteroid belt, approximately 6.5 kilometers in diameter. It was discovered on 22 February 1938, by Finnish astronomer Yrjö Väisälä at Turku Observatory in Southwest Finland, and later named for Johannes Gabriel Granö, rector of the University of Turku.

Orbit and classification 

The asteroid is a member of the Flora family, a large group of stony S-type asteroids in the main-belt. It orbits the Sun in the inner main-belt at a distance of 1.9–2.5 AU once every 3 years and 3 months (1,194 days). Its orbit has an eccentricity of 0.12 and an inclination of 5° with respect to the ecliptic. As no precoveries were taken, and no previous identifications were made, Granös observation arc begins with its official discovery observation in 1938.

Physical characteristics

Slow rotator 

A rotational lightcurve of Granö was obtained from photometric observations made by amateur astronomer Robert Stephens at GMARS and Santana Observatories in March 2010. Analysis gave a long rotation period of 138 hours with a brightness variation of 0.65 magnitude. This makes Granö a slow rotating asteroid. The result supersedes a previous period of 5.1 hours from May 2007.

Diameter and albedo 

According to the surveys carried out by the Japanese Akari satellite and NASA's Wide-field Infrared Survey Explorer with its subsequent NEOWISE mission, Granö measures between 6.17 and 9.70 kilometers in diameter, and its surface has an albedo between 0.171 and 0.429. The Collaborative Asteroid Lightcurve Link assumes a standard albedo for stony asteroids of 0.20 and calculates a diameter of 6.81 kilometers using an absolute magnitude of 13.2.

Naming 

This minor planet was named after Johannes Gabriel Granö (1882−1956), Finnish professor of geography and rector at University of Turku from 1932 to 1934. The official  was published by the Minor Planet Center on 30 January 1964.

Notes

References

External links 
 Asteroid Lightcurve Database (LCDB), query form (info )
 Dictionary of Minor Planet Names, Google books
 Asteroids and comets rotation curves, CdR – Observatoire de Genève, Raoul Behrend
 Discovery Circumstances: Numbered Minor Planets (1)-(5000) – Minor Planet Center
 
 

001451
Discoveries by Yrjö Väisälä
Named minor planets
001451
19380222